Blue wall may refer to:

 Blue wall (U.S. politics), a group of high-population U.S. states commonly leaning Democratic, so that the Democratic Party's winning of those states would most likely win them the presidential election
 Blue wall (British politics), a group of Conservative-leaning UK parliamentary constituencies which are seen as shifting away from the party
 Blue wall of silence, a code among some police officers not to report misconduct by fellow officers, paralleling the "green wall" among prison correction officers
 "The Blue Wall", an episode of the television series Law & Order
 The Blue Wall, a 2018 documentary about the murder of Laquan McDonald